The 1967 Walker Cup, the 21st Walker Cup Match, was played on 19 and 20 May 1967, at Royal St George's Golf Club, Sandwich, Kent, England. The event was won by the United States 13 to 7 with 4 matches halved.

The United States took an 8 to 1 lead on the first day. Great Britain and Ireland did much better on the second day, winning the morning foursomes. Needing just two wins in the afternoon singles, the United States won four and halved another for a convincing victory.

Format
The format for play on Friday and Saturday was the same. There were four matches of foursomes in the morning and eight singles matches in the afternoon. In all, 24 matches were played.

Each of the 24 matches was worth one point in the larger team competition. If a match was all square after the 18th hole extra holes were not played. The team with most points won the competition. If the two teams were tied, the previous winner would retain the trophy.

Teams
Ten players for the United States and Great Britain & Ireland participated in the event. Great Britain & Ireland had a playing captain, while the United States had a non-playing captain.

Great Britain & Ireland
 & 
Playing captain:  Joe Carr
 Michael Attenborough
 Michael Bonallack
 Tom Craddock
 Rodney Foster
 Dudley Millensted
 Peter Oosterhuis
 Sandy Pirie
 Sandy Saddler
 Ronnie Shade

United States

Captain: Jess Sweetser
Don Allen
William C. Campbell
Ron Cerrudo
Bob Dickson
Marty Fleckman
Jimmy Grant
Downing Gray
Jack Lewis Jr.
Bob Murphy
Ed Tutwiler

Friday's matches

Morning foursomes

Afternoon singles

Saturday's matches

Morning foursomes

Afternoon singles

References

Walker Cup
Golf tournaments in England
Walker Cup
Walker Cup
Walker Cup